Mohammad Mahdi Vaezi Esfahani (born 5 July 1966), better known as Mohammad Esfahani, is an Iranian Persian pop and traditional singer.
He graduated from The Medical Sciences University of Iran in 1997, while learning Iranian music from the famous Iranian traditional singer Mohammad-Reza Shajarian and his best student Ali Jahandar.

Biography
He was born in Tehran. His father, Mohammad Ali Vaezi, was a physician who was also the governor of Esfahan shortly after the revolution. He was of Esfahani descent, and his mother was born in Tehran. Mohammad Mehdi completed his primary and secondary education at the Alavi School and won a place in the juvenile category in the Quran competitions before the revolution. He was scheduled to be sent to Kuwait to win a position in the Quran competition, which was canceled due to his mother's opposition. From an early age, he learned to recite the Qur'an in three narrations from the masters of the time and has benefited from various methods of this art, especially the Mustafa Ismail method. Mohammad Mehdi entered  Medical School of Iran University of Medical Sciences and graduated in 1997. He is married and has three children.

Professional career
Esfahani has released 14 albums to date. In his albums, he has worked with great music masters such as Homayoun Khoram, Babak Bayat, Fereydoun Shahbazian
The wordless is the name of another work of Mohammad Esfahani; The wordless was released in a completely new atmosphere, the wordless is accompanied by a clip about Emam Reza, which has been released on this album. The album distribution company has announced that 200,000 copies of this work have been sold in the first 2 weeks of its release.

National Orchestra of Iran 
With the election of the new leader of the Iran's National Orchestra, Mohammad Esfahani was introduced as the singer of the National Orchestra.

Studio albums
Alnour
Golchin – (Iranian Classical Music)
Tanhatarin Sardar
Velayat-e Eshg – (Iranian SoundTrack)
Hasrat
Faseleh
Tanha Mandam (I was left alone) – (Iranian National Music) 
Mah-e-Gharibestan (The Moon of Solitude)
Noon o Dalghak
Haft Sin (ranian National Music)
Ekhrajiha
Barkat
Hozour 1 (In live concert)
Hozour 2 (In live concert)
Bi Vajeh (Wordless)
Shekveh

Single Songs
Vasl o Hejran  
Zarrin Kolah  
Sabzeye Norooz  
Faryadras  
Hala ke Oumadi  
Armaghan Tariki  
Mahaleh Ashegham Basheh  
Nafas  (Theme music of Nafas)
Saghf  
Daghe Nahan  
Behesht Az Dast Adam Raft

References

External links

  Mohammad Esfahani's official website
 Instagram page
 musicema
 Spotify

Living people
21st-century Iranian male singers
Iranian pop singers
Iranian singer-songwriters
Singers from Tehran
1966 births
20th-century Iranian male singers